The list of ship launches in 1768 includes a chronological list of some ships launched in 1768.


References

1768
Ship launches